Sacher is a surname. Origins can be traced back to Germany. Notable people with the surname include:

Franz Sacher, Austrian baker
Hotel Sacher, a five-star hotel in Vienna
Harry Sacher, British Zionist and lawyer
Lara Sacher, Australian actress
Paul Sacher, Swiss conductor, patron and impresario
Sarolta Zalatnay (born Charlotte Sacher, 1947), Hungarian singer
Helmut Sacher, German painter

See also
Leopold von Sacher-Masoch, Austrian writer and journalist

German-language surnames